Urge for Offal is the thirteenth album by UK Wirral-based rock band Half Man Half Biscuit, released 20 October 2014 on Probe Plus Records. The album reached #68 on the UK album chart.

Nigel Blackwell of Half Man Half Biscuit has discussed the album in one of his rare interviews.

The cover art depicts Neil Crossley, the band's bass player, and a ride from an obsolete decommissioned merry-go-round.

Track listing

Critical reception 
In an early online review, Jon Bryan rated the album 9.5/10, and wrote:

In an online review in The Quietus, Luke Slater wrote:

In an online review in Louder Than War magazine, Mark Whitby wrote:

In December 2014, readers of The Guardian voted Urge for Offal best album of the year even though that newspaper had never reviewed or even mentioned it.

Cultural background 
As is usual with Half Man Half Biscuit, the songs contain multiple references to both serious and popular culture, to sport, and to local geography; among other things. Those identified include:
 "Westward Ho!Massive Letdown"
 Westward Ho!, a large seaside village and resort in Devon, England
 Blue flag status, a certification by the Foundation for Environmental Education that a beach, marina or sustainable boating tourism operator meets its standards
 Claw crane, a type of arcade game
 Northam, a small town to the east of Westward Ho!
 Devon cream tea, a light meal taken in the afternoon, consisting of tea accompanied by scones, clotted cream and jam
 Crazy golf, an offshoot of the sport of golf focusing solely on the putting aspect of its parent game, often found at seaside resorts
 Frank Ifield (born 1937), English-born Australian easy listening and country music singer
 Bacup, a town in Lancashire, England
 Phoebus, a title of the Greek god Apollo, here used as a poetic name for the Sun
 "This One's for Now"
 Corner, a method of restarting play in the game of association football which rarely leads to a goal
 Mr Universe, one of several bodybuilding contests
 Delph, a village bureaucratically located in the Metropolitan Borough of Oldham, Greater Manchester, England but actually in Yorkshire
 DFS, a British furniture retailer
 TNS: The New Saints F.C., an association football club which plays in the Welsh Premier League
 The Blob, a public house said to be one of the least pleasant in Liverpool
 Vengloš: Jozef Vengloš (1936–2021), former Slovak football player and coach
 Rock Ferry, an area of Birkenhead, Wirral, England
 "You’re so beige, I bet you think this song’s about someone else", a parody of lines from Carly Simon's 1972 song "You're So Vain"
 Standard Liège, a Belgian top-flight football club
 Gerry Gow (1952–2016), Scottish footballer who played for Bristol City in the 1970s
 "As told to a boil on the cab driver's neck", a quotation from the song "Fun Day in the Park" on the 2011 album 90 Bisodol (Crimond) by Half Man Half Biscuit
 "Baguette Dilemma for the Booker Prize Guy"
 Booker Prize, a literary prize awarded each year for the best original novel written in the English language and published in the UK
 Aloysius Umbongo N’Danga O’Reilly, a fictional personage equipped with calamity powder
 Aloysius, a masculine given name, a Latinisation of the names Louis, Lewis, Luis, Luigi, Ludwig, and so on 
 Um Bongo, a brand of juice drinks produced by Sumol + Compal, first produced in 1983 by Nestlé (under the Libby's brand) for consumption in the United Kingdom, later licensed for production in Portugal
 O'Reilly, a surname of Irish origin
 Hoylake, a seaside town within the Metropolitan Borough of Wirral, Merseyside, England
 The Red Rocks, a geological feature near Hoylake
 Hilbre, a tidal island and Site of Special Scientific Interest near Hoylake, access to which is hampered by quicksand which can be a death trap for the unwary and for over-exuberant civic dignitaries
 Beadle, a minor official who carries out various civil, educational or ceremonial duties for civic dignitaries
 Lord Gort VC (18861946), British and Anglo-Irish soldier who commanded the British Expeditionary Force which was sent to France in the first year of the Second World War and was evacuated from Dunkirk
 Berwyn, an isolated and sparsely populated area of moorland located in the northeast of Wales
 RNLI, the Royal National Lifeboat Institution, the largest charity that saves lives at sea around the coasts of the British Isles, operators of lifeboat station
 "My Outstretched Arms"
 Thwaite, a village in North Yorkshire
 "The Bane of Constance"
 Victory V, a British brand of liquorice-flavoured lozenges
 Eintracht Oblong, a fictional football club
 Sagittarius, a constellation and astrological sign
 Tibor, a masculine given name found throughout Europe
 Heswall Flower Club, an organisation based in Heswall, a town in Wirral, Merseyside, England
 Iron Age, the period generally occurring after the Bronze Age, marked by the prevalent use of iron
 Cagoule, a lightweight (usually unlined) weatherproof raincoat or anorak with a hood, often knee-length
 Viceroy: Vauxhall Viceroy, an executive car produced 197782
 Back nine, holes 1018 on an 18-hole golf course
 Midge Ure (born 1953), Scottish musician and singer-songwriter
 British Museum, dedicated to human history, art, and culture, located in the Bloomsbury area of London
 Halfords, a British retailer of car parts, car enhancement, camping, touring and bicycles
 "Theme Tune for Something or Other"
 An instrumental
 "False Grit"
 The title parodies that of the 1969 western movie True Grit starring Kim Darby and John Wayne
 Haynes refers to Haynes Manuals, a series of practical manuals relating to the maintenance and repair of automotive vehicles
 Suranne Jones (born 1978), English actress who rose to prominence playing the role of Karen McDonald in the soap opera Coronation Street
 Rodney Ontong (born 1955), South African-born cricketer
 Lynsey de Paul (19482014), English singer-songwriter who represented UK in the Eurovision Song Contest 1977 with the song "Rock Bottom"
 Antonine Wall, a turf fortification on stone foundations, built by the Romans across what is now the Central Belt of Scotland, between the Firth of Forth and the Firth of Clyde, begun 142 and completed about 12 years later
 "Old Age Killed My Teenage Bride"
 Origin of Species: On the Origin of Species, an 1859 work of scientific literature by Charles Darwin
 King James: King James Version, an English translation of the Christian Bible for the Church of England which was begun in 1604 and which fell from Heaven in 1611
 Dr Forbes: John Forbes (17871861), Scottish physician who attended Queen Victoria 184161
 Cash in the Attic, a UK BBC TV show 200212, which helped you find hidden treasures in your home and then sold them for you at auction.
 Abseil, a controlled descent of a vertical drop, such as a rock face, using a rope
 "Urge for Offal"
 Urge for Offal, a fictional band
 Stale Craig, a fictional guitarist who decided he didn't like his brain
 Dean Almond, a fictional drummer
 Mick Exclusion Zone, a fictional vocalist and model maker based in Leicester
 Harwich, a town in Essex, England, one of the Haven ports
 Brawn, a terrine or meat jelly made with flesh from the head of a calf or pig, or less commonly a sheep or cow, often set in aspic
 Alan Gilzean (1938–2018), Scottish professional footballer active in the 1960s and 1970s
 Harsh, a fictional band
 Libby's, a U.S.-based food company known for its canned food including pear halves
 "Stuck up a Hornbeam"
 Hornbeam, a relatively small hardwood tree in the genus Carpinus
 Mynah bird, a bird in the starling family (Sturnidae), noted for its ability to reproduce sounds, including human speech, when in captivity
 Crewe, a railway town and civil parish within the unitary authority area of Cheshire East and the ceremonial county of Cheshire, England
 Junction 16, on the M6 motorway
 Spork, a hybrid form of cutlery taking the form of a spoon-like shallow scoop with two to four fork tines which can be used for eating soup
 Live at the Apollo, a British stand-up comedy programme performed from the Hammersmith Apollo Theatre in west London
 Zen, a school of Mahayana Buddhism that originated in China during the Tang dynasty as Chán and spread south to Vietnam, northeast to Korea and east to Japan
 Hammerfist, a side-scrolling beat 'em up video game developed by Vivid Image and released in 1990 for the Commodore Amiga, Atari ST, Commodore 64, Amstrad CPC and ZX Spectrum
 DIY: Do it yourself would always be my reply
 "Adam Boyle Has Cast Lad Rock Aside"
 The song refers throughout to the 1973 British mystery horror film The Wicker Man and to the locations where it was filmed
 Adam Boyle, a fictional person
 Dumfries and Galloway, a county in southwestern Scotland comprising the historic counties of Dumfriesshire, Wigtownshire and Stewartry of Kirkcubright
 Plockton, a village in the Highlands of Scotland in the county of Ross and Cromarty
 Skye, the largest and most northerly major island in the Inner Hebrides of Scotland
 Union Jack, the national flag of the United Kingdom (Also known as the "Union Flag")
 Epiphone, an American manufacturer of stringed instruments including guitars
 "Much has been said of the strumpets of yore", the first line of the song "Landlord's Daughter" in The Wicker Man
 BBC4, a British television channel which shows a wide variety of programmes including comedy, documentaries, music, international film, original programmes, drama and current affairs
 Beltane, the anglicised name for the Gaelic May Day festival
 Topic: Topic Records, a British folk music record label
 'Spoons: Wetherspoons, a British pub chain known for cask ale, low prices, long opening hours, no music, and its food
 Mac and Katie Kissoon (born 1943 and 1951 respectively), a male and female vocal duo from Port of Spain, Trinidad, known for bubblegum pop and as backing singers and session musicians
 Creetown, a small seaport town in the Stewartry of Kirkcudbright
 Kirkcudbright, a town and parish in Dumfries and Galloway, Scotland (pronounced kir–coo–bree) 
 Gatehouse of Fleet, a town in the civil parish of Girthon, Kirkcudbrightshire
 The Golden Bough, a comparative study of mythology and religion, by the Scottish anthropologist Sir James George Frazer (18541941)
 "The Unfortunate Gwatkin"
 Daniel Gwatkin, a fictional person
 Gwatkin is a surname
 Bridgedale, a manufacturer of thermal and other varieties of sock 
 The churchyard of St Lawrence: St Lawrence's Church, Stoak, Cheshire
 Nelson Burt, nine year-old boy (son of Albin R. Burt) who drowned during the Mersey hurricane of 1822 and is buried in the churchyard of St Lawrence, Stoak; credited as producer of the 2011 album 90 Bisodol (Crimond) by Half Man Half Biscuit
 Slow Dempsey, a fictional person associated with Woodside Farm
 Woodside Farm, near Wervin, which is a small village and civil parish in the unitary authority of Cheshire West and Chester
 Wervin Turnpike, a road near Wervin
 Redbush tea, a herbal tea made from the plant Aspalathus linearis, a native of South Africa's fynbos
 Fig roll, a biscuit filled with fig paste that dates back to ancient Egypt
 Cresta, a frothy fruit-flavoured drink produced in the United Kingdom from the early 1970s through to around 2007; the wisdom of drinking it has subsequently been questioned
 Borehamwood, a town in southern Hertfordshire and an outlying suburb of London
 Hall, Stairs and Landing, a fictional band; an experimental trio from Borehamwood
 Scott Verplank (born 1964), American professional golfer
 Newcombe and Roche: John Newcombe (born 1944) and Tony Roche (born 1945), Australian tennis players who won multiple doubles titles together
 Congolesi Unsworth, a fictional band from Glasgow, whose songs were all written by the lead singer's grandfather
 Jodie Mudd (born 1960), American  professional golfer
 Chongo, a character in the TV series Danger Island
 Danger Island, a 196869 live-action TV adventure serial
 "Mileage Chart"
 Travel sweets, a glucose-based boiled sweet dusted with glucose powder, manufactured by UK company A. L. Simpkin & Co. Ltd, sold in close-fitting airtight tins often made hard to open by the action of moisture and heat on the glucose powder
 Matrix sign, an electronic traffic sign used on roadways to give travellers information about special events such as delays
 Arley Hall, a country house in the village of Arley, Cheshire, England
 Toll road, a public or private roadway for which a fee (or, toll) is charged for passage
 Stoke, several places in UK
 Ullapool, a small isolated town in Ross-shire, Scottish Highlands
 Deal, a town in Kent, England, 685 miles from Ullapool 
 Armageddon, according to the Book of Revelations Revelation, the site of a gathering of armies for a battle during the end times
 Lower Nowhere, a fictional place
 ETA: Estimated time of arrival

References

External links 
 
 

2014 albums
Half Man Half Biscuit albums